Disease carrier could refer to:

 Asymptomatic carrier, a person or organism infected with an infectious disease agent, but displays no symptoms 
 Genetic carrier, a person or organism that has inherited a genetic trait or mutation, but displays no symptoms